Petrophila danaealis is a moth in the family Crambidae, which was described by George Hampson in 1906 and lives in Mexico.

References

Petrophila
Moths described in 1906